KWYU (96.9 FM) is a radio station licensed to serve the community of Christine, Texas. The station is owned by Rufus Resources, LLC, and airs a classic country format as part of a group of stations branded as the "No Bull Radio Network".

The station was assigned the KWYU call letters by the Federal Communications Commission on April 7, 2016.

References

External links
 Official Website
 FCC Public Information File for KWYU
 

WYU
Radio stations established in 2018
2018 establishments in Texas
Classic country radio stations in the United States
Atascosa County, Texas